The Dragon Knight is a 2011 Chinese animated film directed by Shengjun Yu. The film was released on September 30, 2011.

Reception
The film earned  at the Chinese box office.

References

External links

2011 animated films
2011 films
Chinese animated films